The Athletics at the 2016 Summer Paralympics – Women's 400 metres T37 event at the 2016 Paralympic Games took place on 13 September 2016, at the Estádio Olímpico João Havelange.

Heats

Heat 1 
10:24 12 September 2016:

Heat 2 
10:32 12 September 2016:

Final 
10:14 13 September 2016:

Notes

Athletics at the 2016 Summer Paralympics